This article lists important figures and events in Malayan public affairs during the year 1949, together with births and deaths of significant Malayans.

Incumbent political figures

Central level
 Governor of Malaya :
 Henry Gurney
 Chief Minister of Malaya  :
 Tunku Abdul Rahman Putra

State level
  Perlis :
 Raja of Perlis : Syed Harun Putra Jamalullail 
 Menteri Besar of Perlis : Raja Ahmad Raja Endut
  Johore :
 Sultan of Johor : Sultan Ibrahim Al-Masyhur
 Menteri Besar of Johore : Onn Jaafar 
  Kedah 
 Sultan of Kedah : Sultan Badlishah
 Menteri Besar of Kedah : Mohamad Sheriff Osman 
  Kelantan :
 Sultan of Kelantan : Sultan Ibrahim
 Menteri Besar of Kelantan : Nik Ahmad Kamil Nik Mahmud 
  Trengganu :
 Sultan of Trengganu : Sultan Ismail Nasiruddin Shah
 Menteri Besar of Trengganu :
 Tengku Mohamad Sultan Ahmad (until 26 December)
 Raja Kamaruddin Idris (from 26 December)
  Selangor :
 Sultan of Selangor : Sultan Sir Hishamuddin Alam Shah Al-Haj
 Menteri Besar of Selangor :
 Hamzah Abdullah (until 1 July)
 Raja Uda Raja Muhammad (from 1 July)
  Penang :
 Monarchs : King George VI
 Residents-Commissioner : Arthur Vincent Aston
  Malacca :
 Monarchs : King George VI
 Residents-Commissioner :
  Negri Sembilan :
 Yang di-Pertuan Besar of Negri Sembilan : Tuanku Abdul Rahman ibni Almarhum Tuanku Muhammad 
 Menteri Besar Negri Sembilan : Abdul Malek Yusuf
   Pahang :
 Sultan of Pahang : Sultan Abu Bakar
 Menteri Besar of Pahang : Mahmud Mat
  Perak :
 British Adviser of Perak : James Innes Miller
 Sultan of Perak : Sultan Yusuf Izzuddin Shah
 Menteri Besar of Perak : Abdul Wahab Toh Muda Abdul Aziz

Events
 27 February – The Malayan Chinese Association (MCA) was founded.
 4 May – The Pan-Malayan Federation of Trade Union (PMFTU) president, Ganapathy, 24, was killed.
 8 October – The establishment of University of Malaya from the merger of King Edward VII College of Medicine and Raffles College in Selangor.
 4 November – A Malay named Ismail bin Awang killed seven people and wounded at least four others in Sungai Dua, Penang.
 Unknown date – The Communities Liaison Committee (CLC) was established.

Births 
 19 February – Osu Sukam – Politician and former Chief Minister of Sabah
 6 March – Hilmi Yahaya – Politician
 7 March – G. Palanivel – Politician
 28 July – Soh Chin Aun – Footballer
 24 August – Mohd Ali Rustam – Politician and former Chief Minister of Malacca
 8 September – Ng Lam Hua – Politician
 2 November – A. R. Badul – Actor and comedian
 11 November – Sultan Ismail Petra – 28th Sultan of Kelantan (died 2019)
 14 November – Mohd Isa bin Hj. Abdul Samad – Politician and FELDA chairman
 Unknown date – Koh Tsu Koon – Politician and former Chief Minister of Penang

Deaths
 4 May – Ganapathy – Pan-Malayan Federation of Trade Union (PMFTU) president

See also 
 1949
 1948 in Malaya | 1950 in Malaya
 History of Malaysia

References 

 
Years of the 20th century in Malaysia
Malaya
Malaya
Malaya